This is a list of commanders of the 24th Infantry Division of the United States Army, which was activated in 1941.  It was inactive from 1957 to 1958, 1970 to 1975, 1996 to 1999, and since 2006.  The 24th Division's antecedents were known as the Hawaiian Division, which existed from 1921 to 1941.

Commanders

MG Durward S. Wilson, October 1941 – July 1942
MG Frederick A. Irving, August 1942 – October 1944
MG Roscoe B. Woodruff, November 1944 – November 1945
BG Kenneth F. Cramer, November 1945 – December 1945
MG James A. Lester, December 1945 – January 1948
MG Albert C. Smith, January 1948 – April 1949
MG Anthony C. McAuliffe, April 1949 - May 1949
MG William F. Dean, June 1949 – July 1950
MG John H. Church, July 1950 – January 1951
MG Blackshear M. Bryan, January 1951 – December 1951
MG Henry I. Hodes, January 1952 – February 1952
BG Paul D. Adams, February 1952 – March 1952
BG George W. Smythe, March 1952 – October 1952
BG Wilbur E. Dunkelberg, October 7–30, 1952
BG Barksdale Hamlett, October 1952 – November 1952
MG Charles L. Dasher Jr., November 1952 – October 1953
MG Carter B. Magruder, November 1953 – January 1954
BG Carl I. Hutton, January 1954 – February 1954
MG Paul D. Harkins, March 1954 – July 1954
MG Mark McClure, July 1954 – June 1955
MG Stanhope B. Mason, July 1955 – October 1956
MG Russell L. Vittrup, October 1956 – April 1957
BG Charles H. Bonesteel III, April 1957 – May 1957
MG Ralph W. Zwicker, May 1957 – October 1957 (Division Inactive  October 1957 – July 1958)
MG Ralph C. Cooper, July 1958 – September 1959
BG Albert Watson II, September 1959 – October 1959
BG Autry J. Maroun, October 1959 – November 1959
MG Edwin A. Walker, November 1959 – April 1961
BG Harry J. Lemley, April 1961 – May 1961
MG Charles H. Bonesteel III,  May 1961 – April 1962
MG Benjamin F. Taylor, April 1962 – April 1963
BG William A. Enemark, April 1963 – May 1963
MG William A. Cunningham III, May 1963 – July 1965
MG Edward L. Rowny, July 1965 – September 1966
BG Herron M. Maples, September 1966 – October 1966
MG Roderick A. Wetherill, October 1966 – August 1968
MG Linton S. Boatwright, August 1968 – September 1969
MG Robert R. Linville, September 1969 – March 1970 (Division Inactive April 1970 – September 1975)
MG Donald E. Rosenblum, September 1975 – September 1977
MG James B. Vaught, September 1977 – August 1979
MG James F. Cochran III, August 1979 – May 1981
MG John R. Galvin, June 1981 – June 1983
MG H. Norman Schwarzkopf, June 1983 – June 1985
MG Andrew L. Cooley, June 1985 – July 1987
MG Michael F. Sprigelmire, July 1987 – September 1988
MG Horace G. Taylor, September 1988 – June 1990
MG Barry R. McCaffrey, June 1990 – May 1992
MG Paul E. Blackwell, May 1992 – June 1994
MG Joseph E. DeFrancisco, June 1994 - May 1996 (Inactive April 1996 – 5 June 1999)
MG Freddy E. McFarren, 9 June 1999 - 4 August 2000
MG Robert J. St. Onge Jr., 4 August 2000 - 7 November 2001
MG Thomas F. Metz, 7 November 2001- 3 February 2003
BG Frank Helmick, 3 February 2003 - 15 May 2003
MG Dennis E. Hardy, 15 May 2003 - 1 August 2006 (Inactive since August 2006)

References

Sources

Internet

Lists of United States military unit commanders
United States Army officers
Infantry divisions of the United States Army